Dhupguri Girl's College, established in 2013, is the women's general degree college in Dhupguri. It offers undergraduate courses in arts. The campus is in the Jalpaiguri district. It is affiliated to University of North Bengal.

Departments

Arts

Bengali 
English
History
Sanskrit
Political Science
Philosophy
Sociology
Education

Accreditation
The college is recognised by the University Grants Commission (UGC).

See also

References

External links
 
University of North Bengal
University Grants Commission
National Assessment and Accreditation Council

Colleges affiliated to University of North Bengal
Educational institutions established in 2013
Universities and colleges in Jalpaiguri district
Women's universities and colleges in West Bengal
2013 establishments in West Bengal